Adolph Lippe (11 May 1812 near Goerlitz, Prussia – 23 January 1888 in Philadelphia) was a homeopathic physician who worked in the United States.

Biography
His parents were Count Ludwig (1781–1860) and Countess Auguste (1795–1856) of Lippe-Weissenfeld. Adolph got a legal education at Berlin. After completing his legal studies, Lippe became interested in homeopathy, and emigrated to the United States in 1837 to further his study. In 1838, he enrolled in the North American Academy of Homeopathy at Allentown, Pennsylvania, from where he graduated in 1841.

He moved to Pottsville, thence to Carlisle, where he remained six years, and was successful in his treatment of the epidemics that then prevailed in Cumberland Valley. He then settled in Philadelphia, where from 1863 until 1868 he was professor of materia medica in the Homeopathic College of Pennsylvania. He devoted himself to establishing the claims of homeopathy, and augmenting and improving its materia medica.

Works
Besides some essays and treatises from the French, German, and Italian which became standards, Lippe was author of two books:
Comparative Materia Medica (Philadelphia, 1854)
Text-Book of Materia Medica (1866)

Family
He married Theresia Eichhorn and later Louise Augustine d'Arcy.  Of his six children, two daughters died in infancy.  His surviving daughter was Auguste Camilla (1847–1884).  His three sons were Constantin (1840–1885), Francis Louis (born 1845), and William Alphonse (1850–1912). William Alphonse and his second wife survived him.

Notes

References

External links 
 Materia Medica by Adolf zur Lippe, full book

1812 births
1888 deaths
American homeopaths
German emigrants to the United States
Educators from Allentown, Pennsylvania
People from Carlisle, Pennsylvania
Physicians from Philadelphia
People from Pottsville, Pennsylvania
People from the Kingdom of Prussia